The Watco Australia WRA Class is an Australian diesel-electric locomotive, built by the National Railway Equipment Company in the United States for use on Watco Australia's services in Queensland.

History 
In 2018, Watco Australia announced the order of 8 of the WRA Class locomotives for use on the Queensland Rail network. They are equipped with a V12 diesel prime mover, rated at 1.6MW. The locomotive is similar in specification to local units, such as the 2300 class. They have been modified to work in multi with Watco's other motive power.

Delivery to Australia 
On 16 August 2019, Watco Australia announced that the first two units were being delivered to Australia. WRA001 and 002 arrived at The Port of Brisbane on the vessel Tarago on 9 October 2019 and were transferred to Warwick behind QR locomotive 1724.
The company began grain and cattle operations with the locos in 2020 after certification and testing.

References

External links 

 

Diesel-electric locomotives of Australia
Queensland Rail locomotives